For the 2014 FIFA World Cup qualification, there were two scheduled inter-confederation play-offs to determine the final two qualification spots to the 2014 FIFA World Cup.

Format
The four teams from the four confederations (AFC, CONCACAF, CONMEBOL, and OFC) were drawn into two ties at the World Cup Preliminary Draw at the Marina da Glória in Rio de Janeiro, Brazil, on 30 July 2011. This was different from previous editions, where the matchups were decided by FIFA beforehand and no draw was held for the inter-confederation play-offs.

In each tie, the two teams played a two-legged home-and-away series. The two winners, decided on aggregate score, qualified for the 2014 FIFA World Cup in Brazil.

Qualified teams

Matches
The first legs were played on 13 November 2013, and the second legs were played on 20 November 2013.

AFC v CONMEBOL

Uruguay won 5–0 on aggregate and qualified for the 2014 FIFA World Cup.

CONCACAF v OFC

Mexico won 9–3 on aggregate and qualified for the 2014 FIFA World Cup.

Goalscorers
There were 17 goals scored in 4 matches, for an average of 4.25 goals per match.

5 goals
 Oribe Peralta

2 goals
 Chris James

1 goal

 Paul Aguilar
 Raúl Jiménez
 Rafael Márquez
 Carlos Peña
 Rory Fallon
 Edinson Cavani
 Nicolás Lodeiro
 Maxi Pereira
 Cristian Rodríguez
 Cristhian Stuani

References

External links
 2014 FIFA World Cup Brazil matches and results at FIFA.com
 Live Preliminary Draw

Play-Off